Canfieldite is a rare silver tin sulfide mineral with formula: Ag8SnS6. The mineral typically contains variable amounts of germanium substitution in the tin site and tellurium in the sulfur site. There is a complete series between canfieldite and its germanium analogue, argyrodite. It forms black orthorhombic crystals which often appear to be cubic in form due to twinning. The most typical form is as botryoidal rounded grape-like masses. Its Mohs hardness is 2.5 and the specific gravity is 6.28. Canfieldite exhibits conchoidal fracturing and no cleavage.

Canfieldite was first described in 1893 from an occurrence in Colquechaca, Potosí Department, Bolivia. It was named for Frederick Alexander Canfield (1849–1926), an American mining engineer.

See also
List of minerals
List of minerals named after people

References

Silver minerals
Tin minerals
Sulfide minerals
Orthorhombic minerals
Minerals in space group 33